Jacques Dimitri Reeves (born October 8, 1982) is a former American football cornerback in the National Football League (NFL) for the Dallas Cowboys, Houston Texans and Kansas City Chiefs. He was drafted by the Dallas Cowboys in the seventh round of the 2004 NFL Draft. He played college football at Purdue University.

Early years
Reeves attended Lancaster High School. As a senior defensive back, he had 4 interceptions (2 returned for touchdowns) and 5 fumble recoveries. He also practiced track and basketball.

He ran the 200 metres in 20.72 seconds and the 400 metres in 46.01 seconds. He was a member of the Dallas Morning News All-area 100 team.

College career
He accepted a football scholarship from Purdue University. As a true freshman he played on special teams, tallying 11 tackles. The next year, he started 3 games, posting 32 tackles, 2 interceptions and 3 forced fumbles (led the team).

As a junior he became a regular starter, registering 33 tackles and 3 interceptions (tied for the team lead). As a senior, he collected 64  tackles, 2 interceptions, 9 passes defensed and one sack. He played in a total of 49 games, registering 140 tackles (2 for loss), 7 interceptions, 17 passes defensed, 4 forced fumbles and 2 fumble recoveries.

He also practiced track. He received Big Ten Freshman of the Year honors after placing second in the 60 metres (6.80 seconds) and 200 metres (21.04 seconds) at the 2001 Big Ten Indoor Championships. He won the 100 metres (10.41 seconds) and finished second in the 200 metres (20.83 seconds) at the 2002 Big Ten Outdoor Championships. He placed second in the 200 metres (21.47 seconds) and third in the 60 metres (6.78 seconds) at the 2003 Big Ten Indoor Championships.

Professional career

Dallas Cowboys
Reeves was selected by the Dallas Cowboys in the seventh round (223rd overall) of the 2004 NFL Draft. As a rookie, he appeared in 15 games (one start), registering 14 tackles, 4 passes defensed, one fumble recovery, 6 special teams tackles and 13 kickoff returns for 199 yards. The next year, he collected 11 tackles, 4 passes defensed and 9 special teams tackles (seventh on the team).

In 2006, he had 13 special teams tackles (sixth on the team). The next year, he started 13 games mostly in place of an injured Anthony Henry, finishing with a career-high 60 tackles (52 solo) and one interception.

During his time with the Cowboys, he played in 60 games (14 starts), totaling 87 tackles (77 solo), 19 passes defensed and one interception.

Houston Texans
On March 1, 2008, he was signed as an unrestricted free agent by the Houston Texans to a five-year contract. Reeves started all 16 regular-season games, leading the team with 4 interceptions, while registering 19 passes defensed and 49 tackles (46 solo).

On August 4, 2009, he broke his left fibula in a collision with wide receiver André Davis when both were going for a deep pass in a practice session. Reeves didn't return until Week 8, and made an interception against the Buffalo Bills. The injury limited him to 12 games (5 starts).

He was released on September 3, 2010, after he was demoted to a third-string role. With the Texans he started 21 of 28 games, recorded 77 tackles (69 solo), 5 interceptions and 26 passes defensed.

Kansas City Chiefs
After two seasons out of football, Reeves signed with the Kansas City Chiefs on February 24, 2012. He was placed on the injured reserve list on September 25, after suffering a hamstring injury. He was waived on September 28 with an injury settlement.

References

External links
Purdue bio

1982 births
Living people
People from Lancaster, Texas
Players of American football from Texas
American football cornerbacks
Purdue Boilermakers football players
Dallas Cowboys players
Houston Texans players
Kansas City Chiefs players